KUWL (90.1 FM) is a jazz radio station licensed to Laramie, Wyoming, United States. The station is part of Wyoming Public Radio, a division of Wyoming Public Media.  It serves the Laramie area and is currently owned by University of Wyoming. KUWL broadcasts 24 hours a day, seven days a week, is commercial-free, and offers NPR News updates hourly.  The station plays the music of both new and established artists and offers live streaming on its website.

See also
 List of jazz radio stations in the United States

References

External links

UWL
Jazz radio stations in the United States
UWL
NPR member stations
Radio stations established in 2008
UWL
2008 establishments in Wyoming